Astroblepus mariae is a species of catfish of the family Astroblepidae. It can be found on the Meta River in Colombia and Venezuela.

Named in honor of Hermano Apolinar Maria (1867-1949), Director, Museum at the Instituto de La Salle, Bogotá, who collected the type species and offered Fowler the opportunity to study it.

References

Bibliography
Eschmeyer, William N., ed. 1998. Catalog of Fishes. Special Publication of the Center for Biodiversity Research and Information, num. 1, vol. 1–3. California Academy of Sciences. San Francisco, California, United States. 2905. .

Astroblepus
Freshwater fish of Colombia
Fish of Venezuela
Fish described in 1919
Taxa named by Henry Weed Fowler